Elmingir also Elminegeir,  Elmingeir (fl. 555) was a Hun general fighting for the Byzantine Empire.

Biography
He fought in the Lazic War, which saw the Byzantine Empire pitted against the Sasanian Empire. At the Siege of Phasis, he protected the Byzantine ships.

Etymology
His name is, probably coincidentally, a homophone of Tungusic elmin, "young horse". This was also the name of a Manchu tribe. If such were indeed the origin of his name it would made it the only known Tungusic word in the Hunnic vocabulary.

References

Hun military leaders
Generals of Justinian I
People of the Roman–Sasanian Wars
Byzantine people of Hunnic descent
Lazic War